The SCCA National Sports Car Championship was a sports car racing series organized by the Sports Car Club of America from 1951 until 1964.  It was the first post-World War II sports car series organized in the United States.  An amateur championship, it was eventually replaced by the professional United States Road Racing Championship and the amateur American Road Race of Champions, which continues to this day as the SCCA National Championship Runoffs.

History
The championship was created in 1951 from existing SCCA events.  Until 1953 a single championship was awarded, with points paid based on finishing position within each class.  Beginning in 1954 champions were named in each class.

Following the 1962 season, the professional USAC Road Racing Championship collapsed, leaving many competitors looking for a series. The SCCA created the United States Road Racing Championship as a professional series for 1963, moving focus away from the amateur National Championship.  For 1965, the SCCA dropped the national championship series and awarded national championships to champions from each region.  Top drivers from the regions were invited to the American Road Race of Champions (today known as the National Championship Runoffs) at the end of the season.  For 1966, national championships were awarded only to winners at the ARRC, a system which continues today as the Runoffs has become the most prestigious road racing event for club racers.

Champions

Overall (1951–1953)

Modified classes (1954–1964)

Production classes (1954–1965)

‡Tie

References

External links
World Sports Racing Prototypes: SCCA National Sports Car Championship archive
Racing Sports Cars: SCCA National Sports Car Championship archive
Large 1950's SCCA Race Program And Results Page

 
National Sports Car Championship
Scca National Sports Car Championship
Scca National Sports Car Championship